William Moran or Bill Moran may refer to:
 William F. Moran (admiral) (born c. 1960), United States Navy admiral
 William F. Moran (knifemaker) (1925–2006), knifemaker who founded the American Bladesmith Society
 William H. Moran (1864–1946), United States Secret Service agent
 William Joseph Moran (1906–1996), Roman Catholic bishop
 William L. Moran (1921–2000), American Assyriologist
 William Thomas Alldis Moran (1903–1942), Australian naval officer
 Bill Moran (catcher) (1869–1916), catcher and left fielder in Major League Baseball
 Bill Moran (pitcher) (born 1950), American politician and retired baseball pitcher
 Billy Moran (born 1933), American baseball player
 Francis D. Moran (born 1935), also known as "Bill" Moran, American admiral, third Director of the National Oceanic and Atmospheric Administration Commissioned Officer Corps